Cert or CERT may refer to:
 Carbon Emission Reduction Target, a United Kingdom government initiative
 CERT Group of Companies, a private education provider in the Middle East
 Constant Extension Rate Tensile testing, a standard method of testing of materials, also known as slow strain rate testing
 Certificate (disambiguation), several meanings
 Certiorari, a Latin legal term for a court order requiring judicial review of a case
 Certiorari before judgment, a specific form of a writ of certiorari 
Cert pool, shorthand term for the pool of applicants for a writ of certiorari from the United States Supreme Court
 Community Emergency Response Team, teams of volunteer emergency responders across the United States
 Computer Emergency Response Team, an expert group that handles computer security incidents
CERT Coordination Center (CERT/CC), the worldwide center for coordinating information about Internet security at Carnegie Mellon University, the first and most well-known CERT
 CERT C Coding Standard, developed by the CERT/CC at Carnegie Mellon University
United States Computer Emergency Readiness Team (US-CERT)
 Correctional Emergency Response Team, a team of correction officers
 Council of Energy Resource Tribes, a consortium of tribes to establish tribal control over natural resources
 Council of Education, Recruitment and Training Irish hospitality training authority 1963–2003

See also
 Certs, a brand of breath mints
 Ceirt, a letter of the Ogham alphabet